Clostridium acidisoli  is a nitrogen-fixing bacterium from the genus of Clostridium which has been isolated from acidic peat bog soil from the Fichtel Mountains in Germany.

References

 

Bacteria described in 2000
acidisoli